Ancillae-Assumpta Academy is a private, Catholic, co-educational school for students in Pre-school through grade 8 in Wyncote, Pennsylvania, United States. It is sponsored by the Handmaids of the Sacred Heart of Jesus. Ancillae's sports program competes in the Catholic Academy League (C.A.L).

History
In 1946 the Handmaids of the Sacred Heart began kindergarten classes at Church Road in Wyncote, Pennsylvania. The following year they opened a private elementary school for girls named Ancillae Academy, from the Latin word for handmaid. In 1957, the Handmaids founded Assumpta Academy, a boys' school named after Mother Assumption Escauriaza, a founding sister.

In 1969, the two merged to become Ancillae-Assumpta Academy. The school is located on the former estate of the late George Horace Lorimer, longtime editor of the Saturday Evening Post and president and chairman of the Curtis Publishing Company.

Accreditation
Ancillae-Assumpta is accredited by the Commission on Elementary Schools of the Middle States Association of Colleges and Schools since 1981. The current accreditation is for a period of seven years from December 2012 until December 2019. This is the fourth reaccreditation for the school. The previous reaccreditations were in 1990 and 2001.

Recognitions and awards
The academy has been recognized by the U.S. Department of Education as an "Exemplary Private School" and as a *National Blue Ribbon Award recipient in 1992 and in 2010.

Students from Ancillae-Assumpta were among those awarded scholarships to LaSalle College High School.

Ancillae-Assumpta Academy won first place in the Creative Video Contest sponsored by the World Meeting of Families Congress held in Philadelphia in September 2015. Initiated by Pope John Paul II in 1994, the Congress is held every three years in a different location. Pope Francis is scheduled to attend.

The 2015 Ancillae-Assumpta JV Football team won the Catholic Academy League championship, with a perfect 8–0 season.

References

External links

 PSS, U.S. Dept. of Education
"Ancillae-Assumpta Academy honored as a 2010 National Blue Ribbon School", Montgomery Media, December 4, 2010
 

Catholic elementary schools in Pennsylvania
Schools in Montgomery County, Pennsylvania
Cheltenham Township, Pennsylvania